Damu is a 1996 Indian Bengali-language drama film directed by Raja Sen and produced by the Government of West Bengal. It is based on Narayan Gangopadhyay's novel Ponchanoner Haati and is Sen's directorial debut. The film was released on 26 October 1996 and won National Film Award for Best Children's Film.

Plot
Damu is an innocence orphan lives in the village with an old man Panchanan. He develops a friendship with the Panchanan's granddaughter Runku. One day he carelessly promises her an elephant ride through the village. But this is impossible to manage an elephant in a village hence Runku is disappointed. To fulfill the promise, Damu sets out in search of an elephant. In his journey, he faces humiliation, taunting, harassment but does not lose hope. Finally, Damu comes across a circus but the manager refuses to meet him. Circumstances arise where Damu saves the circus from a gang of a robbers. Out of gratitude, the circus manager allows Damu to borrow an elephant and Runku gets her elephant ride in the village.

Cast
 Raghuvir Yadav as Damu
 Sabyasachi Chakraborty as Potai Chor
 Manoj Mitra as Daroga
 Gyanesh Mukherjee as Owner of Circus
 Satya Bandyopadhyay as Panchanan
 Tarun Kumar Chatterjee as Jagai Ghosh
 Rimi Sen as Runku
 Dulal Lahiri as Bhatu
 Ajit Bandyopadhyay as Nibaran Chakraborty
 Anamika Saha as Badan's wife
 Monu Mukherjee as Kalim Sheikh
 Smita Sinha as Runku's Grandmother
 Dhiman Chakraborty as Badan
 Gautam Dey as Nitai, Runku's father

Accolades

References

External links
 

1996 drama films
1996 films
1996 directorial debut films
1990s Bengali-language films
Indian drama films
Bengali-language Indian films
Films set in India
Films based on works by Narayan Gangopadhyay
Best Children's Film National Film Award winners
Indian children's films